The Skirmish in Doubtful Canyon took place on May 3, 1864, between a company of infantry from the California Column and a band of about 100 Apaches. The fighting occurred near Steins Peak in Doubtful Canyon, Arizona Territory. Doubtful Canyon, along with Apache Pass and Cookes Canyon, was a favored location for an ambush by the Apache along the Butterfield Overland Mail route.

The Californians were on the march from Fort Cummings to Fort Bowie in the military District of Arizona, when they were attacked in the canyon. The band of Apaches were defeated by 54 men of Company I, 5th California Volunteer Infantry Regiment under Lieutenant Henry H. Stevens. The skirmish lasted about an hour until the Apache fled. The Apache lost 10 killed and  20 wounded. The Californians lost 1 missing and 5 wounded according to official records. Michno claims the battle lasted almost two hours and that the Californians suffered 6 wounded (1 mortally), and 1 missing, presumed killed.

References

Conflicts in 1864
Battles of the California Column of the American Civil War
Union victories of the American Civil War
Battles involving the Apache
Battles involving the United States
History of Hidalgo County, New Mexico
History of United States expansionism
19th-century military history of the United States
Battles of the Trans-Mississippi Theater of the American Civil War
Apache Wars
Battles of the American Civil War in Arizona
May 1864 events